National Development Council may be:

 National Development Council (India)
 National Development Council (Poland)
 National Development Council (Rwanda)
 National Development Council (Taiwan)